F-box protein 15 also known as Fbx15 is a protein that in humans is encoded by the FBXO15 gene.

Function

Members of the F-box protein family, such as FBXO15, are characterized by an approximately 40-amino acid F-box motif. SCF complexes, formed by SKP1, cullin, and F-box proteins, act as protein-ubiquitin ligases. F-box proteins interact with SKP1 through the F box, and they interact with ubiquitination targets through other protein interaction domains.

Biochemically, Fbx15 is a substrate receptor of an ubiquitin ligase belonging to the family of the F-box proteins.  Differently from other F-box proteins, Fbx15 recognizes its substrate Kif1-Binding Protein (KBP) in an acetylation dependent manner.

Importance in embryonic stem cells 

Fbxo15 is a protein expressed in undifferentiated embryonic stem cells.

It is expressed during coexpression of Oct3/4, c-Myc, Klf4, and SOX2, four genes identified to be important in embryonic stem cell self-renewal and differentiation repression.

In mice having a beta-galactosidase gene knocked into the Fbx15 locus, stain was detected in ES cells, early embryos (from two-cell to blastocyst stages), and testis tissue.
There is an enhancer site upstream of the Fbx15-encoding transcription gene that contains an octamer-like binding motif and a Sox-like binding motif. Reporter gene analyses demonstrated that the ES cell-specific expression required this 18-bp enhancer element located approximately 500 nucleotides upstream from the transcription initiation site. Deletion or point mutation of either motif abolished the enhancer activity. It became active in NIH 3T3 cells when Oct3/4 and Sox2 were coexpressed and cooperatively bind to the enhancer sequence.

Targeted deletion of the Fbx15 gene in mice does not result in embryonic lethality or gross developmental aberrations, despite the fact that Fbx15-/- mice are sub-fertile when compared to their wild-type counterparts.  This might be explained by the fact that Fbx15-/- embryonic stem cells display a proliferation defect - caused by the accumulation of the Fbx15 substrate KBP - generating a short-term bottleneck during the early stages of embryogenesis.  In fact, targeting of KBP is required to prevent an unscheduled mitochondrial biogenesis that, in naïve pluripotent stem cells, causes increased mitochondrial oxidative phosphorylation and production of reactive oxygen species.

The selective expression of Fbx15 and its dependency on the activity of the pluripotency core factors Oct3/4 and Sox2 promoted the use of the expression of Fbx15 as the first marker of reprogramming of fibroblasts into induced pluripotent stem cells.

References